Reese Kenneth Griffiths (25 December 1937 – 16 September 2016) was a New Zealand rugby league player who represented New Zealand in the 1957 and 1960 World Cups.

Playing career
Griffiths played in the outside backs for Runanga in the West Coast Rugby League competition. He represented the West Coast between 1954 and 1964, and the South Island in 1965.

He was first selected for the New Zealand national rugby league team in 1957 and attended the World Cup that year as an injury replacement for Neville Denton. Griffiths went on to play in eleven test matches for the Kiwis between 1957 and 1963, including at the 1960 World Cup. He finished his international career having played in 35 games and scored 18 tries for New Zealand.

In 1960 Griffiths was also involved in the West Coast side that won the Northern Union Cup from Auckland.

Personal life
Griffiths worked in the West Coast mines and also owned a commercial fishing boat. He is commemorated in a mural on the side of a Runanga dairy, alongside George Menzies and Bernie Green.

Griffiths died in Greymouth on 16 September 2016.

References

1937 births
2016 deaths
New Zealand rugby league players
New Zealand national rugby league team players
West Coast rugby league team players
Rugby league wingers
Rugby league centres
Runanga players
South Island rugby league team players